Sture Johnsson (born 1945) is a retired badminton player from Sweden who won numerous Swedish national and international men's singles titles. His game was characterized by impressive stamina and mobility, and a powerful overhead smash.

Career 
Johnsson won men's singles at the first European Badminton Championships in 1968. He eventually won three singles titles at this biennial event (1968,  1970 and 1974), a total bested only by Peter Gade in the early 2000s. He won the World Invitational Championships in 1971 held in Glasgow and reached the semifinals of men's singles at the All-England Championships on four occasions and was one of only a very few players to beat Rudy Hartono in tournament play during Hartono's prime (semifinals of 1973 German Open). Johnsson was a member of six consecutive Swedish Thomas Cup teams between 1963 and 1979.

He also competed at the first ever IBF World Championships in Malmö, in 1977, and was defeated in quarterfinals by the eventual champion Flemming Delfs.

1972 Summer Olympics 
Johnsson competed in badminton at the 1972 Summer Olympics, as a demonstration sport competition. In men's singles, he lost in semifinals against Rudy Hartono, 15-2, 15-4. In mixed doubles he played with Eva Twedberg, and they were beaten in the first round by Roland Maywald and Brigitte Steden of West Germany.

Achievements

European Championships 
Men's singles

Other achievements

References

External links 

Living people
Swedish male badminton players
Badminton players at the 1972 Summer Olympics
1945 births
Sportspeople from Västra Götaland County
People from Mölndal Municipality
20th-century Swedish people